West Long Beach (or "the Westside") is a working-class neighborhood in Long Beach, California.

It is the westernmost part of Long Beach, separated from the rest of the city by the Long Beach Freeway (Interstate 710) and the Los Angeles River.  Its boundaries are the Los Angeles River to the east, Interstate 405 to the north, Anaheim Street to the south, and Los Angeles, Carson and the Terminal Island Freeway to the west.

The largest industry in the area is the combined Ports of Long Beach and Los Angeles.  There is also a large Shell Oil refinery in nearby Wilmington and the massive Intermodal Container Transfer Facility (ICTF) on the neighborhood's western edge. The neighborhood is a mix of older residential housing, apartments and townhouses, and industrial buildings.  The primary thoroughfare is Santa Fe Avenue, which runs north to south through the center of the neighborhood.  The neighborhood has three official parks, including Silverado Park.  In 2010 a renewed 12.39 acre park, named after Rear Admiral Isaac C. Kidd, was completed next to Cabrillo High School.

The neighborhood was historically a working-class neighborhood due to its proximity to the Port of Long Beach and the large Shell Oil refinery in nearby Wilmington.  A large U.S. Navy housing complex once stood in the neighborhood, on Santa Fe Avenue near Pacific Coast Highway (Cabrillo High School now stands on the site).  Like many neighborhoods with largely working-class populations, deindustrialization in the 1970s took its toll, and the neighborhood was largely poor by the early 1980s.  A local neighborhood group, the West Long Beach Association, was founded in 1997 to improve the living conditions in the neighborhood.  While conditions have improved in the early 2000s, the neighborhood is still one of the poorest in Long Beach.  , residents in West Long Beach had no access to banking services.  There has been and continues to be heavy gang activity and a high rate of violent crime in the neighborhood, and large portions of the neighborhood are under gang injunctions directed at the East Side Longos, West Side Longos gang and Rollin 80's West Coast Crip Gang, as well as home to other local gangs such as Sons of Samoa Samoan gang, Westside Islanders Chamorro/Filipino gang, Pimpside Phamily Filipino gang, Cove Side Neighborhood Crip gang, and Long Beach Satanas Filipino gang. 

West Long Beach has a history of Japanese Americans starting with fishery workers who once lived on Terminal Island in the turn of the 20th century. 

According to the 2000 US Census, there were 35,637 residents of the 90810 ZIP code, which is nearly coterminous with West Long Beach. In terms of race and ethnicity, the neighborhood's population was roughly 23.8% Caucasian, 16.4% African American, 0.8% American Indian, 23.2% Asian, 3.1% Pacific Islander, 27.2% other races, and 5.5% two or more races. Hispanics and Latinos made up 45.6% of the population.

The area is served by Cabrillo High School (9–12), Stephens Middle School (6–8), Muir Academy (K–8), Garfield Elementary (K-5) and Hudson School (K-8); all operated by the Long Beach Unified School District.  Police service in the area is rendered by the Long Beach Police Department Western Division, which operates a station at Pacific Coast Hwy and Santa Fe.

See also
Neighborhoods of Long Beach, California

References

Neighborhoods in Long Beach, California